Battery Tynes is a historic artillery battery located at James Island, Charleston, South Carolina. It was built in 1863, and designed to protect the upper Stono River and the bridge from James Island to Johns Island, South Carolina. The earthen redoubt measures approximately 320 feet long and 180 feet deep. It has a 10–20 foot high parapet wall and a 15 feet high powder magazine.

It was listed on the National Register of Historic Places in 1982.

References

Military facilities on the National Register of Historic Places in South Carolina
Military installations established in 1863
Buildings and structures in Charleston County, South Carolina
National Register of Historic Places in Charleston, South Carolina
American Civil War on the National Register of Historic Places